Alessia Fabiani (born 10 December 1976) is an Italian model, showgirl and TV presenter.

She was born in L'Aquila. After working for some years as model and after performing minor roles in TV shows, she became Letterina ("Letter-carrier") in Canale 5's Passaparola. She later participated in the Italian version of The Farm.

References

1976 births
Living people
People from L'Aquila
Italian female models
Participants in Italian reality television series